Casey Wasserman (born Casey Myers; 1974) is an entertainment executive and sports agent executive who owned the now defunct Arena Football League team the Los Angeles Avengers. He is the son of the Los Angeles socialite and philanthropist Lynne Wasserman and Jack Myers (formerly Meyerowitz). His parents were divorced and he took his mother's maiden name, which is also the last name of his famous grandfather Lew Wasserman. His sister's name is Carol Ann Leif. He is married to movie music supervisor Laura Ziffren. He headed the successful Los Angeles bid to host the 2028 Summer Olympics and became president of the Los Angeles Olympic Organizing Committee.

Family background and education
Casey Wasserman is the son of the Los Angeles socialite and philanthropist Lynne Wasserman and Jack Myers (formerly Meyerowitz), who are both Jewish. His parents were divorced and he took his mother's maiden name, which is also the last name of his famous grandfather, MCA studio executive Lew Wasserman, whom he credits as his greatest teacher. The two would have breakfast together every Saturday and Sunday from the time when Casey was a child until the elder Wasserman's death in 2002. The younger Wasserman said, "He was my most valuable resource in terms of information. In broad terms he knew what he wanted to do and I followed in his footsteps." Wasserman's sister is comedian Carol Ann Leif.

Wasserman obtained a Bachelor of Arts degree in Political Science from the University of California at Los Angeles (UCLA). He credits his maternal grandfather, Lew Wasserman, head of MCA, as his greatest teacher. The two would have breakfast together every Saturday and Sunday from the time when Casey was a child to the elder Wasserman's death in 2002. The younger Wasserman said, "He was my most valuable resource in terms of information. In broad terms he knew what he wanted to do and I followed in his footsteps." According to a quote from an interview with his father Jack Myers: "'My son changed his name to Wasserman,' Jack Myers told author Dennis McDougal, who wrote 'The Last Mogul,' a biography of Lew Wasserman. 'I said, 'Casey, first of all everyone will think you're a fool if you do that. You look like an idiot.'" After graduation from UCLA, Casey Wasserman worked as an investment banker.

He is married to movie music supervisor Laura Wasserman, whose grandfather Paul Ziffren was a Democratic Party leader and chaired the Los Angeles 1984 Summer Olympics Organizing Committee. They have two children, Emmet and Stella.

Arena Football
In 1998, he purchased the Los Angeles Avengers of the Arena Football League (AFL). He paid about $5 million for the franchise rights. Despite his youth, he was elected chairman of the league. In 2002 he negotiated a groundbreaking national television partnership between the league and NBC television, as well as the collective bargaining agreement with its players. On Saturday, April 18, 2009, Wasserman sent an email to AFL's de facto commissioner informing him of his decision to terminate the L.A. Avengers' membership in the Arena Football League.

Wasserman (Agency)
The same year that he purchased the football team, Casey Wasserman started Wasserman (then-called Wasserman Media Group), a sports marketing and talent management company, of which he remains CEO.

In 2002, WMG acquired the sports marketing and naming-rights company Envision and the action sports marketing and representation firm The Familie, based in Carlsbad, CA.

In 2004, WMG purchased 411 Productions and a few months later relaunched it as Studio 411, a sports entertainment film studio. The business was designed to provide financing, obtain sponsorships and arrange distribution in support of original productions. The company also made an unsuccessful bid to sign up enough athletes in BMX, skateboarding and freestyle motocross to form PGA-like sanctioning bodies in those sports.

In January, 2006 WMG acquired the NBA and MLB sports agent business of Arn Tellem, a well-known sports agent who joined WMG as well. Several of Tellem's sports agent colleagues also joined the company as part of the deal. Until he retired in June, 2015, Tellem was a principal at the company and ran one of its management groups.

In November 2006, the company acquired soccer agency, SFX, in the UK. Through that acquisition, WMG came to represent such players as Steven Gerrard, Robbie Keane, Jamie Carragher, Michael Owen, Tim Cahill, Jonathan Woodgate, Wes Brown, Scott Parker, Jack Wilshere, Park Ji-Sung, Shay Given, Tim Howard and Emile Heskey.

In June 2007, WMG expanded its consulting and media and property capabilities by purchasing Raleigh, NC-based OnSport.

In early 2011, WMG bought London-based media rights manager and advisory firm Reel Enterprises.

That year WMG expanded its golf talent roster by acquiring SFX Golf in April 2011.

In 2016, Wasserman Media Group rebranded as Wasserman and is frequently referred to as "Team Wass".

LA 2028 Olympic Organizing Committee
Casey Wasserman successfully led Los Angeles' bid for the 2028 Summer Olympics and will head the city's Olympic organizing committee.

In 2015, the USOC selected Los Angeles as the American applicant for the 2024 Summer Olympics after withdrawing Boston's bid. Wasserman commented: "We live in a democracy. The city and the council and the communities need to be engaged and supportive, otherwise we won't be successful regardless." In 2017, the IOC decided to award the hosts of both the 2024 and 2028 Summer Olympics. At the 131st IOC Session, Paris was selected to host the 2024 Summer Olympics, with Los Angeles being selected to host the 2028 Summer Olympics. The LA bid was praised by the IOC for using a record-breaking number of existing and temporary facilities and for relying entirely on corporate funding.

Anti-racism and the International Olympic Committee
On June 19, 2020, Wasserman reportedly wrote the International Olympic Committee (IOC) President Thomas Bach to advocate for changes to be made to the controversial Rule 50 of the Olympic Charter which states: "No kind of demonstration or political, religious or racial propaganda is permitted in any Olympic sites, venues or other areas." In the letter, Wasserman urged the IOC to amend the guidelines that support Rule 50 of the Olympic Charter to allow anti-racist advocacy on the Olympic stage and stated “Being anti-racist is not political.”

President Bach refuted the suggestion in an op-ed for The Guardian titled "The Olympics are about diversity and unity, not politics and profit. Boycotts don't work, and athletes should be politically neutral."

Political activities
Wasserman co-chaired a fundraiser for Hillary Clinton's presidential campaign on August 22, 2016.

See also
2028 Summer Olympics

References

External links
 ESPN Casey Wasserman Story February 2011
Avengers website bio (cached)
Biography from Jules Stein Eye Institute
"Biz game for crossover", Variety interview, 7 February, 2005
Lew Wasserman Biography

	

Living people
Arena Football League executives
Jewish American philanthropists
1974 births
American sports agents
University of California, Los Angeles alumni
American investment bankers
Philanthropists from California
Presidents of the Organising Committees for the Olympic Games
21st-century American Jews